Roubidoux Township is an inactive township in Pulaski County, in the U.S. state of Missouri.

Roubidoux Township takes its name from Roubidoux Creek.

References

Townships in Missouri
Townships in Pulaski County, Missouri